Ishige is a genus of brown algae (class Phaeophyceae) occurring in the warm temperate regions of the western Pacific Ocean. It is the only genus in the family Ishigeaceae.

References

External links 

Brown algae
Brown algae genera